−5 may refer to:
 The negative of the number 5
 The Minus 5, American band
 The Minus 5 (album), album by the group of the same name
 Minus V, compilation album by Do As Infinity

See also
 Under-five, is a SAG-AFTRA contract term for an American television or film actor whose character has fewer than five lines of dialogue